The 28th edition of the Men's Asian Amateur Boxing Championships was held from August 26 to September 5, 2015 in Bangkok, Thailand.

Medal summary

Medal table

References
Medalists

External links
Results

2015
Asian Boxing
Boxing
International boxing competitions hosted by Thailand